The Crush (also known as Kung Fu Fighting) is a 1972 Hong Kong martial arts film directed by Tu Guangqi and starring Chan Hung-lit, Jason Pai and Ingrid Hu.

Cast
Chan Hung-lit as Japanese head villain
Jason Pai as Huang
Ingrid Hu as Korean female fighter
Tony Lo as Korean man
Steve Chan as Cruel Japanese Lieutenant
Kwan Yung-moon as Son of Korean Master
Lee Fung-lan
Han Tae-Il
Kim Ki-bum as Elder Japanese
Hung Pau-hei
Wong Sau-sau
Bae Su-cheon as Japanese thug
Kim Young-In as Huge Japanese
Chiu Tak-ming as Chinese Kung Fu Kid

See also
 Can Dialectics Break Bricks? (1972)

References

External links
 IMDb entry
 Crush at Hong Kong Cinemagic
 Crush at Hong Kong Movie Database

1972 films
1972 martial arts films
1970s action films
Hong Kong action films
Hong Kong martial arts films
Kung fu films
Taekwondo films
Karate films
1970s Mandarin-language films
1970s Hong Kong films